The 1986 Japanese Formula Two Championship was contested over 8 rounds. 12 teams, 19 drivers, 2 chassis and 3 engines competed.

Results

Final point standings

Driver

For every race points were awarded: 20 points to the winner, 15 for runner-up, 12 for third place, 10 for fourth place, 8 for fifth place, 6 for sixth place, 4 for seventh place, 3 for eighth place, 2 for ninth place and 1 for tenth place. No additional points were awarded. The best six results count.

References

Super Formula
Formula Two